Instituto San Martín Curicó in Chile is a primary and secondary school founded by the Marist Brothers in 1912.

Activities 
Sponsored activities include workshops in theater, literature, crafts, music, ballet-dance, and plastic arts. The school also sponsors football, athletics, volleyball, basketball, table tennis, chess, and handball. In 2016 the San Martin boys' and girls' athletics teams and the boys' soccer team won the championship at tournaments organized by the University of Talca that bring together 64 teams.

References  

Marist Brothers schools 
Catholic schools in Chile
Educational institutions established in 1912
1912 establishments in Chile